Utricularia lateriflora, the small bladderwort, is a small to medium-sized perennial carnivorous plant that belongs to the genus Utricularia. U. lateriflora is endemic to Australia and can be found in New South Wales, Queensland, South Australia, Tasmania, and Victoria. It grows as a terrestrial plant in sandy or peaty soils in heathland at lower altitudes. It was originally described and published by Robert Brown in 1810.

See also 
 List of Utricularia species

References 

Carnivorous plants of Australia
Flora of New South Wales
Flora of Queensland
Flora of South Australia
Flora of Tasmania
Flora of Victoria (Australia)
lateriflora
Lamiales of Australia